The 2014–15 Kategoria Superiore was the 76th official season, or 79th season of top-tier football in Albania (including three unofficial championships during World War II) and the sixteenth season under the name Kategoria superiore. The season began on 23 August 2014 and ended on 22 May 2015.

Teams

Stadia and last season

Personnel and kits

Note: Flags indicate national team as has been defined under FIFA eligibility rules. Players and Managers may hold more than one non-FIFA nationality.

League table

Results
Each team plays every opponent four times, twice at home and twice away, for a total of 36 games.

First half of season

Second half of season

Leader week after week

Season statistics

Scoring

Top scorers

Hat-trick

Clean sheets

Scoring
First goal of the season: Fatjon Sefa for Skënderbeu against KF Elbasani (23 August 2014)
Fastest goal of the season: 12 seconds Stevan Račić for Partizani against KF Elbasani(20 December 2014)

Discipline

Player

Most yellow cards: 11
Bruno Telushi (Flamurtari)
Most red cards: 2
Ervin Bulku (KF Tirana)
Xhulio Jaupi (KF Elbasani)
Gledi Mici (Flamurtari)

Club

Most red cards: 8
Skënderbeu

Attendances

Awards
Monthly awards

References

External links
 
Superliga at uefa.com
Livescore

2014-15
2014–15 in European association football leagues
1